The CONCACAF Championship was an association football tournament that took place between 1963 and 1989. The competition is sometimes referred to as CONCACAF Campeonato de Naciones.

The first Championship took place in 1963 and was CONCACAF's first organized tournament for national teams. The competition retained its tournament format and was played on a biennial basis for a decade.

In 1973 the tournament became the qualifying tournament for the FIFA World Cup and was played on a quadrennial basis. The CONCACAF trophy was given to the team that ranked highest in the qualifying group. In 1985 and 1989, there was no host nation for the competition.

The competition was discontinued in 1991 in favor of the CONCACAF Gold Cup.

Tournament results

Notes

Debut of teams
A total of 15 teams participated in the championship:

Overall team records
In this ranking 2 points are awarded for a win, 1 for a draw and 0 for a loss. As per statistical convention in football, matches decided in extra time are counted as wins and losses, while matches decided by penalty shoot-outs are counted as draws. Teams are ranked by total points, then by goal difference, then by goals scored.

Medal table

Comprehensive team results by tournament
Legend
 – Champions
 – Runners-up
 – Third place
 – Fourth place
 – Semi-finals
 – Quarter-finals
GS – Group stage
Q – Qualified for upcoming tournament
 – Did not qualify
 – Disqualified
 – Did not enter / Withdrew / Banned
 – Hosts

For each tournament, the number of teams in each finals tournament are shown (in parentheses).

Top goalscorers

Hat-tricks

Winning managers

Host nations and venues

Results of host nations and defending champions

See also
 CONCACAF Gold Cup
 CONCACAF Women's Championship
 Football continental championships

References

External links
 Official site

 
Championship
Defunct international association football competitions in North America
Recurring sporting events established in 1963
Recurring events disestablished in 1989
1963 establishments in North America
1989 disestablishments in North America